The Interregnum of World Chess Champions was the period between March 24, 1946 (the date of Alexander Alekhine's death) and May 17, 1948 (when Mikhail Botvinnik won a special championship tournament).

History
When Alekhine suddenly died in 1946, the title of World Chess Champion became vacant for the first time in its 60-year history. Since the 19th century, the title was decided by matches between the current champion and a challenger, who by winning would become the new champion. Alekhine died holding the title, leaving no obvious method for a new player to succeed him.

The situation was very confused, with many respected players and commentators offering different solutions, for example: Max Euwe should be declared champion because he was the last player to win a championship match; Mikhail Botvinnik should be declared champion because Alekhine had accepted a challenge from Botvinnik before his death; or Euwe should play a match for the title against Botvinnik. FIDE, the international chess federation, found it very difficult to organize the early discussions on how to resolve the interregnum because problems with money and travel so soon after the end of World War II prevented many countries from sending representatives – most notably the Soviet Union. The shortage of clear information resulted in otherwise responsible magazines publishing rumors and speculation, which only made the situation more confused.

FIDE's discussions mainly favored: A round-robin tournament involving the world's top players, to determine who would be the new World Champion (their first proposal in July 1946 nominated Euwe, Botvinnik, Paul Keres, Vasily Smyslov, Reuben Fine, Samuel Reshevsky and one of the winners of the Groningen and Prague tournaments to be held later in 1946).   (Most of these were participants in the 1938 AVRO tournament.)  Afterwards, a match for the title every 3 years after that, the challenger being selected by a series of tournaments. But some writers suggest that at the 1947 FIDE congress, Euwe was declared World Champion on a vote that took place just before the Soviet Union's delegates arrived, and the Soviet Union immediately supported the proposal for a World Championship Tournament – so Euwe was deposed after a two-hour "reign" as World Champion. Earlier in 1947 Botvinnik had written an article in which he stated the need to prevent champions from avoiding the strongest challengers and to make sure that the financial arrangements were satisfactory for both players and for whoever was hosting the events; he supported the proposal that the vacant world championship should be filled by the winner of a multi-round all-play-all tournament; and proposed a system for selecting future challengers that was very like FIDE's 1946 proposals and the system that operated from 1948 to 1963. The proposed tournament was very similar in concept to the 1938 AVRO tournament, whose purpose had been to decide who should challenge Alekhine for the title.

The World Championship Tournament took place in 1948, the first half in The Hague and the second in Moscow. Botvinnik won by scoring 14 points out of 20 and making a plus score against each of the other players; in fact he clinched first place some days before the last round ended on 
May 17, 1948. Thus he became the new world champion and brought the interregnum to an end. Competitions for the World Chess Championship would be held exclusively under FIDE's auspices for the next 45 years.

The Interregnum was a unique period in modern chess history. Although there were gaps in the chain of succession of the title when a new champion did not play against the old one (e.g. Anatoly Karpov after Bobby Fischer), the Interregnum currently remains the only period in the history of modern chess in which there was no World Champion.

Women
There was a similar interregnum of the Women's World Chess Championship, between Vera Menchik's death in 1944 and Lyudmila Rudenko winning the championship in 1950.

See also
World Chess Championship 1948

References

History of chess
World Chess Championships
1946 in chess
1947 in chess
1948 in chess
Interregnums